The GAA Football Under-20 All-Ireland Championship (known for sponsorship reasons as the EirGrid GAA Football Under-20 All-Ireland Championship) is an annual inter-county Gaelic football competition organised by the Gaelic Athletic Association (GAA). It is the highest inter-county hurling competition for male players between the ages of 17 and 20 in Ireland. The championship was contested as the All-Ireland Under-21 Championship between 1964 and 2017 before changing to an under-20 age category from 2018.

The final, usually held in August, serves as the culmination of a series of games played during the summer months, and the results determine which team receives the Clarke Cup. The All-Ireland Championship had always been played on a straight knockout basis whereby once a team loses they are eliminated from the championship.

Four teams currently participate in the All-Ireland Championship, with the most successful teams coming from the province of Munster. Teams representing this province have won a total of 22 All-Ireland titles.

The title has been won by 16 different teams, 10 of whom have won the title more than once. The all-time record-holders are Cork, who have won the championship on 12 occasions. Tyrone are the current holders.

Overview
The All-Ireland Under-21 Football Championship was created in 1964 in response to a Congress motion put forward by the Kerry County Board.  Since then the competition has grown in importance and profile.  The championship is run on an inter-county provincial basis with the winners from Munster, Leinster, Ulster and Connacht playing off against each other in two semi-finals.
Cork are the most successful teams in the history of the Under-21 Championship.  Two teams have achieved three-in-a-rows; Kerry from 1975 to 1977 and Cork from 1984 to 1986.  The coveted treble of winning senior, under-21, minor titles in the same year has been achieved on just one occasion, by Kerry in 1975.
Because teams will only play together for at most, about two or three years, unlike the senior competition, it is unusual that one county will dominate for periods any longer than this.

It is usually considered a mark of a very promising player to play for both a county's Under 21 and Senior team at the same time. Many great players have achieved this, although one particular example would be Frank McGuigan, who, in 1973, represented Tyrone in the Ulster Finals of the Minors, Seniors and Under 21s.

Top winners

Wins, runners-up and final appearances

Finals listed by year

References

External links
 Official Website

 
Under-20
Under-20 sports competitions